Nonsense verse is a form of nonsense literature usually employing strong prosodic elements like rhythm and rhyme. It is often whimsical and humorous in tone and employs some of the techniques of nonsense literature.

Limericks are probably the best known form of nonsense verse, although they tend nowadays to be used for straightforward humour, rather than having a nonsensical effect.

Among writers in English noted for nonsense verse are Edward Lear, Lewis Carroll, Mervyn Peake, Edward Gorey, Colin West, Dr. Seuss, and Spike Milligan. The Martian Poets and Ivor Cutler are considered by some to be in the nonsense tradition.

Variants 

In some cases, the humor of nonsense verse relies on the incompatibility of phrases which make grammatical sense but semantic nonsense – at least in certain interpretations – as in the traditional:

Compare .

Other nonsense verse makes use of nonsense words—words without a clear meaning or any meaning at all. Lewis Carroll and Edward Lear both made good use of this type of nonsense in some of their verse. These poems are well formed in terms of grammar and syntax, and each nonsense word is of a clear part of speech. The first verse of Lewis Carroll's "Jabberwocky" illustrates this nonsense technique, despite Humpty Dumpty's later clear explanation of some of the unclear words within it:

Other nonsense verse uses muddled or ambiguous grammar as well as invented words, as in John Lennon's "The Faulty Bagnose":

Here, awoy fills the place of "away" in the expression "far away", but also suggests the exclamation "ahoy", suitable to a voyage. Likewise, worled and gurled suggest "world" and "girl" but have the -ed form of a past-tense verb.  "Somforbe" could possibly be a noun, possibly a slurred verb phrase.  In the sense that it is a slurred verb, it could be the word "stumbled", as in Sam fell onto the drunk side and stumbled on a girl.

However, not all nonsense verse relies on word play.  Some simply illustrate nonsensical situations. For instance, Edward Lear's poem, "The Jumblies" has a comprehensible chorus:

However, the significance of the color of the heads and hands is not apparent and the verse appears to be nonsense.

Some nonsense verse simply presents contradictory or impossible scenarios in a matter-of-fact tone, like this example from Brian P. Cleary's Rainbow Soup: Adventures in Poetry (Millbrook Press, 2004):

Likewise, a poem sometimes attributed to Christopher Isherwood and first found in the anthology Poems Past and Present (Harold Dew, 1946 edition, J M Dent & Sons, Canada – attributed to "Anon") makes grammatical and semantic sense and yet lies so earnestly and absurdly that it qualifies as complete nonsense:

More contemporary examples of nonsense verse include the Vogon poetry from Douglas Adams's The Hitchhiker's Guide to the Galaxy, and the 1972 song "Prisencolinensinainciusol" by Italian multi-talent Adriano Celentano.

Other languages 

Russian nonsense poets include Daniil Kharms and Aleksey Konstantinovich Tolstoy, particularly his work under the pseudonym Kozma Prutkov, and some French exponents are Charles Cros and Robert Desnos. The best-known Dutch Nonsense poet is Cees Buddingh'. On Indian language Bengali Sukumar Roy is the pioneer of nonsense poems and is very famous for writing children's literature. Abol Tabol is the best collection of nonsense verse in Bengali language.

Among German nonsense writers, Christian Morgenstern and Ringelnatz are the most widely known, and are both still popular, while Robert Gernhardt is a contemporary example. Morgenstern's "Das Nasobēm" is an imaginary being like the Jabberwock, although less frightful:

The following observation by F.W. Bernstein has practically become a German proverb.

Julio Cortázar, the Argentinian writer, was famous for playing with language in several works.

See also 

 Clanging
 Doggerel
 Light verse
 Literary nonsense
 Pseudo-anglicism

References

Further reading

External links 

 Nonsense Books by Edward Lear.
 An Edward Lear website.
 Gromboolia, A general nonsense resource site.

 
Riddles
Humorous poems